River City High is an American rock band from Richmond, Virginia, United States. Like many Richmond punk bands, they incorporate other influences into their music, specifically classic rock. They formed out of the bands Fun Size and Inquisition, the latter also including members who would form Strike Anywhere and Ann Beretta.

They released their debut EP in 2000 on Big Wheel Recreation, and quickly signed to Doghouse Records thereafter. For the next three years the group toured the United States, playing over 200 shows a year. They signed a contract with MCA Records but the company folded in 2003 before they could release the material they had recorded for the label. Following some lineup changes, the group returned to Doghouse, and won the 2004 MTV Dew Circuit Breakout contest.

Members
Current
 James Menefee - bass and lead vocals
 Mark Avery - guitar
 Chip Cosby - guitar
 Gregg Brooks - drums
Former
 Pedro Aida
 Greg Butler
 Johnathan Sullivan
 Cam DiNunzio
 Bobby Raw
 Jay McMillan
 Curtis Patton
 Allen Skillman

Discography
 Richmond Motel [EP] CD (Big Wheel Recreation, 2000)
 Forgets Their Manners EP CD  (Doghouse Records, 2001)
 Won't Turn Down CD (Doghouse Records/Big Wheel Recreation, 2001)
 Extended Play EP CD (Doghouse Records, 2004)
 Not Enough Saturday Nights CD (Takeover Records, 2006)

Related bands
 Denali - Cam DiNunzio
 Fun Size
 Grip - Cam DiNunzio
 Inquisition - Mark Avery
 Lazycain - Cam DiNunzio
 Jack's Mannequin - Bobby Raw, Jay McMillan
 Cosby - Chip Cosby

References

External links
 Official Website
 River City High - BandToBand.com

Rock music groups from Virginia
American hard rock musical groups
Doghouse Records artists
Defiance Records artists